Haveri is a city in Karnataka, India. It is the administrative headquarters of Haveri district. Haveri is famous for its cardamom garlands and Byadagi red chillies. Around 25 km away, there is a place called Bada, which is the birthplace of the poet Kanakadasa.

The name Haveri is derived from the Kannada words haavu and keri, which means place of snakes.

Haveri is 7 hours away from Bengaluru by train. By road, it is about 340 km from Bengaluru on NH-48 towards Mumbai. It is located 307 km north of the port city Mangalore.

Tourist attractions of Haveri

 Siddheshvara Temple

The centre of Western Chalukya architectural developments was the region including present-day Bagalkot, Gadag, Koppal, Haveri and Dharwad districts;

Siddheshwara temple at Haveri a staggered square plan with dravida articulation and superstructure, 11th century CE. Miniature decorative dravida and nagara style towers at Siddheshvara Temple in Haveri

 Basavanna Temple
 Utsav Rock Garden is situated at Gotagodi on NH-4 Shiggaon Taluk. It is blended with both modern and art where more than 1000 real life size sculptures are present. It has got 8 world records. It is a unique garden in the whole world.

Geography 
It has an average elevation of 572 metres (1876 feet).

Education 
There are a number of private, aided and government schools and colleges that offer courses in PU, degree and master's degrees.

There is also a new govt medical college started in haveri in 2020.

Demographics 
 India census, Haveri had a population of 67102.  Males constitute 51% of the population and females 49%. Haveri has an average literacy rate of 70%, higher than the national average of 59.5%: male literacy is 76%, and female literacy is 64%.  In Haveri, 13% of the population is under 6 years of age.

Notable People
 Mailara Mahadevappa 
 Gudleppa Hallikeri
 Siddappa Hosamani 
 Lakshman Havanur
 S.S.Basavanala
 Ramachandra Kulkarni aka Ra.Ku. 
 Chandrashekhar Patil aka Champa
 Satish Kulkarni

See also

References 

Chalukya dynasty
Western Chalukya Empire
Cities and towns in Haveri district